"Le miracle" (meaning "The Miracle") is a song recorded by Canadian singer Celine Dion, released as the second single from her 2012 French-language album, Sans attendre. It was written by Marie Bastide and Gioacchino Maurici, and produced by Jacques Veneruso and Patrick Hampartzoumian. "Le miracle" is a pop song about miracles in everyday life. It received generally favorable reviews from music critics, who noted that it is one of the standout tracks on the album. The Thierry Vergnes-directed video features Dion amidst autumn scenery and people jumping in the air to express their happiness.

Background and release
The lyrics and thirty-second previews of all songs from Sans attendre were posted on Dion's official website on 18 October 2012. On 28 October 2012, a week before the album's release, celinedion.com announced that "Le miracle" was chosen as the second single. It became available as a digital download from the album on the day that Sans attendre was released. The cover art for the promotional single was created by the illustrator Aurore Hutton, niece of former French President Valéry Giscard d'Estaing.

Composition
The song was written by Marie Bastide and Gioacchino Maurici, while the production was handled by Jacques Veneruso and Patrick Hampartzoumian, who also produced Dion's previous single, "Parler à mon père". "Le miracle" is a pop song, which begins with a simple piano and Dion's voice which later mingles with children's choir. The track also uses ukulele played by Veneruso. Lyrically, the song is about seeing miracles in everyday life and believing in them. It speaks about love and hope.

Critical reception
The song received generally positive reviews from music critics. Łukasz Mantiuk of All About Music wrote that "Le miracle" is one of the best tracks on the album. He called it a joyful song with a wonderful children's choir. Bernard Perusse from The Gazette commented that the performance and arrangement of "Le miracle" is "refreshingly subdued" and controlled. The song has an "instantly-accessible melody for Dion to navigate," which makes a "perfect vehicle for her to sail gracefully". Kieron Tyler of The Arts Desk called it restrained and noted that even the "massed kiddie chorus is kept in check" and "doesn't stray into the glutinous". Alain de Repentigny from La Presse wrote that it is a catchy pop song that we can hum from the very first listen, but whose charm wears out quickly. According to Pure Charts, "Le miracle" is "one big ray of sunshine" on Sans attendre but is not very original. Marty Tobin of Quai Baco got the impression that he heard the melody of "Le miracle" dozens of times since Joe Dassin, but the presence of the choir and "Celine's touch" make it work well again. Lea Hermann from Focus also liked the song praising the "fresh spring-like" background vocals.

Commercial performance
"Le miracle" enjoyed a great success in Quebec and in late November 2012 it reached the top position on both the Top 100 Francophone and Top 25 Adult Contemporary charts. On 7 November 2012, the single also debuted on the Canadian Adult Contemporary Chart which includes mainly English-language songs, and reached number twenty-one. At the end of November 2012, "Le miracle" entered the charts in Belgium and France where it peaked at numbers twenty-seven and seventy seven, respectively. In December 2012, the single peaked at number thirty on the Radio Chart in Belgium Wallonia. According to Francophonie Diffusion, "Le miracle" was the sixteenth most-played single worldwide during 2013 by Francophone artist.

Music video
The music video for "Le miracle" was directed by Thierry Vergnes and filmed on 2 October 2012 in a golf club in Terrebonne, Quebec. Vergnes previously worked with Dion in 2007 on her videos for "Et s'il n'en restait qu'une (je serais celle-là)" and "Immensité," and in 2012 on "Parler à mon père". The music video for "Le miracle" premiered on 20 November 2012. It was shot under the autumn sun with Dion walking among the trees with orange and red leaves, while several people jump in the air to express their joy and happiness. At the end of the video, a young pregnant woman is shown and a quote from Albert Einstein appears: "There are only two ways to live your life. One is as though nothing is a miracle. The other is as though everything is a miracle". ET Canada called  the video "uplifting". The music video uses the Radio Edit of the song.

Live performances
Dion performed the song during the Canadian television special on 4 November 2012 on TVA, the French television special on 24 November 2012 on France 2, and also in two shows on France 3: Chabada on 2 December 2012 and Céline en toute intimité on 17 December 2012. On 20 December 2012, Dion sang "Le miracle" in another television special on NRJ 12. "Le miracle" was the closing number to her Céline... une seule fois concert held in the Plains of Abraham in Quebec City on 27 July 2013, and one of the closing songs to her concert at the Sportpaleis in Antwerp on 21 November 2013 during the Sans attendre Tour; the former was included in the Céline une seule fois / Live 2013 CD/DVD.

Track listing and formats
 French promotional CD single
 "Le miracle" (Radio Edit) – 3:21

Charts

Credits and personnel
Recording
 Dion's vocal recorded at Echo Beach Studios, Jupiter, Florida

Personnel

 songwriting – Marie Bastide (lyrics), Gioacchino Maurici (music)
 production and arrangements – Jacques Veneruso, Patrick Hampartzoumian
 vocal recording – François Lalonde
 recording assistant – Ray Holznecht
 recording and mixing – Patrick Hampartzoumian
 drums – Laurent Coppola
 bass – Jean-Marc Haroutiounian
 piano – Emmanuel Guerrero
 acoustic guitars, ukulele – Jacques Veneruso
 electric guitars – André Hampartzoumian
 percussion, programming – Patrick Hampartzoumian
 background vocals – Agnès Puget, Jacques Veneruso, Delphine Elbé, Emilie Smill, Patrick Hampartzoumian
 choir – Choeurs du Studio Meyes de La Ciotat

Release history

References

2012 singles
2012 songs
Celine Dion songs
French-language songs